The UK Parliamentary and Scientific Committee (P&SC) is a United Kingdom parliamentary organization established in 1939. It is an all-party parliamentary group.

Overview
The P&SC provides a forum for scientific and technological issues in the UK. It enables a link between UK parliamentarians, scientific bodies, science-based industry, and academia. The committee informs members of both the UK parliament House of Commons and the House of Lords on matters pertaining to public interest and national policy development.

Officers
The following are officers of the P&SC:

 President: The Lord Oxburgh KBE FRS
 Chairman: Stephen Metcalfe MP
 Deputy Chairman: Chi Onwurah MP
 Hon Treasurer: The Lord Willis of Knaresborough
 Hon Secretary: Carol Monaghan MP

See also
 Parliamentary Office of Science and Technology (POST)
 Safety-Critical Systems Club (SCSC)

References

External links
 P&SC website

1939 establishments in the United Kingdom
Organizations established in 1939
Scientific organisations based in the United Kingdom
All-Party Parliamentary Groups